Ben Norris (1910–2006) was an American modernist painter.

Early life
He was born in Redlands, California in 1910 into a middle class Quaker family that traced its roots, on his mother's side, to the Mayflower and to combatants at  the Battle of Bunker Hill.  After graduating Phi Beta Kappa from Pomona College in 1930, he won a fellowship at the Fogg Art Museum at Harvard University where he spent a year and then studied at the Sorbonne in Paris for 11 months.  He traveled extensively throughout Europe before returning to California to pursue a career as a landscape painter.

Career
As an active participant in the California Watercolor School, he had the opportunity to work closely with landscape artist Thomas Craig (1906–1969).  They became friends and in 1936, at Craig's suggestion, Norris accepted the position of first art teacher at the Kamehameha School for Boys in Honolulu.  After a year, he joined the art department at the University of Hawaii as an associate professor, and also took printmaking courses from a colleague.  He served as department chairman from 1945 to 1955.  In 1955, he was awarded a Fulbright professorship to Japan where he was exposed to Asian techniques, motifs and forms.

Ben Norris painted primarily landscapes, and a few still lifes, in the 1930s and 1940s.  In the early 1950s, the landscapes became more abstract, and most of his work was completely abstract by the late 1950s.  In the mid-1960s, he turned to semi-abstract figurative work.  His paintings from the 1970s include Geometric abstraction, nudes, and lush Hawaiian landscapes.  He continued painting these lush tropical landscapes into the 21st century.  He is best known for his watercolor landscapes (such as The Other Edge of the Clearing) and abstract compositions with a strong Japanese influence, such as Shadow Play.  Among public collections holding works by Ben Norris are the Hawaii State Art Museum, the Honolulu Museum of Art, the Isaacs Art Center in Waimea, Hawaii, the Smithsonian American Art Museum (Washington, D.C.) and the Oregon State University Memorial Union (Corvallis, Oregon)

Death
After his retirement in 1975, Ben moved to New York, and then, in 1993, to Stapeley in Germantown, a Quaker sponsored continuing care retirement community in Philadelphia.  He died in Philadelphia, Pennsylvania in 2006.  Ben's brother, Henry Norris, died the same year.

References
 Forbes, David W., Encounters with Paradise: Views of Hawaii and its People, 1778-1941, Honolulu Academy of Arts, 1992, 214-261.
 Haar, Francis and Neogy, Prithwish, Artists of Hawaii: Nineteen Painters and Sculptors, University of Hawaii Press, 1974, 88-95.
 Hartwell, Patricia L. (editor), Retrospective 1967-1987, Hawaii State Foundation on Culture and the Arts, Honolulu, Hawaii, 1987, p. 62
 Honolulu Academy of Arts, Hawaiian Landscapes: Watercolors by Ben Norris, Honolulu, HI, Honolulu Academy of Arts, 1993.
 Morse, Morse (ed.), Honolulu Printmakers, Honolulu, HI, Honolulu Academy of Arts, 2003, p. 24, 
 Norris, Ben, Margaret Norris Castrey and George R. Ellis, Ben Norris, American Modernist, 1910-2006, University of Hawaii Press, 2009.
 Wisnosky, John and Tom Klobe, A Tradition of Excellence, University of Hawai'i, Honolulu, 2002, pp. 92–95
 Yoshihara, Lisa A., Collective Visions, 1967-1997, [Hawaii] State Foundation on Culture and the Arts, Honolulu, Hawaii, 1997, 48.
 http://www.quaker.org/fqa/types/t06-norris.html

Footnotes

Harvard University alumni
University of Paris alumni
20th-century American painters
American male painters
21st-century American painters
21st-century American male artists
Artists from Hawaii
1910 births
2006 deaths
University of Hawaiʻi faculty
Pomona College alumni
20th-century American male artists